Vidalia High School is a public school in Vidalia, Louisiana. The current enrollment is 427 students. The current principal is Bernie Cooley. The current vice principal is Jessica Carter.

Extracurricular activities
Student groups and activities include 4-H, Beta Club, Cooperative Office Education, DECA, FBLA, Fellowship of Christian Athletes, FHA, French club, Governor's Program on Abstinence, marching band, student council, and yearbook.

Athletics
Vidalia's sports teams, known as the Vikings, compete in Louisiana High School Athletic Association-sanctioned competition in class 3A.

Championships
Boys' Basketball Championship
(1) 2010 (3A)

Baseball Championship
(1) 1996 (2A)

Softball Championship
(1) 2003 (2A)

Notable alumni
 Jarrett Hoffpauir, former MLB player (St. Louis Cardinals, Toronto Blue Jays). 
 Keith Woodside, former American Football player with the  Green Bay Packers.

References

External links
 Vidalia High School

Public high schools in Louisiana
Schools in Concordia Parish, Louisiana